Jaal: The Trap is a 2003 Indian Hindi-language action-thriller film directed by Guddu Dhanoa. It stars Sunny Deol, Tabu, Reema Sen and Anupam Kher. It was released on 18 July 2003.

Plot
In troubled Kashmir reside the Kaul family, consisting of Major Amrish, his wife Sudha, a son, Ajay, and a daughter. Ajay meets with two accidents on his motorcycle due to the carelessness of Neha Pandit, this leads to their meeting again, and both fall in love. Ajay finds out that Neha has been widowed, but this does not deter him, and he convinces her father-in-law R. K. Sharma to bless them, which he does. Shortly after his approval, Neha is abducted by terrorist group Wafa-e-Alhak headed by Junaid Afghani, who demand the release of their accomplice Naved Rabhani, and in exchange of Neha, Ms. Anita Choudhary, the daughter of India's Home Minister's Bhagwat Choudhary. Ajay is tasked with abducting Anita and bring her to them if he is to ever see Neha alive again, but Anita has now re-located to New Zealand under the security of Major Amrish Kaul. Ajay travels to New Zealand, Anita falls in love with him and he manages to bring her to Junaid, but confronts him with the intention of rescuing both Anita and Neha, when it is revealed that Neha is a part of Junaid's group and was playing all along to trap Ajay. Anita is taken away and Ajay is thrown off a clif, branded as a terrorist by the government and public. Ajay then goes incognito to set things right and he finally kills all the terrorists including Neha and saves Anita.

Cast

Sunny Deol as Ajay Kaul
Tabu as Neha Pandit/Nusrat Rabbani
Reema Sen as Anita Chaudhry
Amrish Puri as Major Amrish Kaul
Anupam Kher as R. K. Sharma/Captain Rashid
Farida Jalal as Sudha Kaul
Ashish Vidyarthi as Naved Rabbani
Mukesh Rishi as Junaid Afghani
Virendra Saxena as Bhagwat Choudhary
Susheel Parashar as Police Inspector
Ghanshyam Rohera as Sukhwinder Billa aka Singer Billa (Taxi Driver)
Rajesh Khera as Journalist Alok Dass (Ajay's Friend)

Soundtrack

The Soundtrack for the album has been composed by Anand Raj Anand. The track "Indian Indian" gained popularity during the release.

References

External links
 

2003 action films
2003 films
2000s Hindi-language films
Films shot in New Zealand
Films scored by Anand Raj Anand
Indian action films
Kashmir conflict in films
Films directed by Guddu Dhanoa